The Desna is a river in Russia and Ukraine, a major left-tributary of the Dnieper. Its name means "right hand" in the Old East Slavic language.

The water level of the river reached its lowest recorded point in 140 years in June 2020. This water level was 5 m (16 ft) below normal for that time of year.

Geography

Course

The Desna originates in the Smolensk Heights of Smolensk Oblast, Russia. The river's source lies in Yelninsky District, east-southeast from the city of Smolensk and not far from Yelnya in a forest near the village of Naleti. The Desna then flows south through a low and swampy valley toward the city of Bryansk, where the river's right bank rises.

After its confluence with the Seym near the Russian-Ukrainian border, the river then widens, splitting into numerous smaller branches. Its right bank declines again near the city of Chernihiv, and again near one of its tributaries, the Oster, where the Desna continues its course through a low, muddy plain until it finally reaches its mouth near Kyiv at the Dnieper River.

Tributaries

The Desna has many tributaries. The most significant (length more than 100 km) are, from source to mouth:

 Vetma (left)
 Bolva (left)
 Navlya (left)
 Nerussa (left)
 Sudost (right)
 Ubid (right)
 Seym (left)
 Snov (right)
 Oster (left)

Cities and towns on the Desna

 Yelnya, Russia
 Desnogorsk, Russia
 Zhukovka, Russia
 Seltso, Russia
 Bryansk, Russia
 Trubchevsk, Russia
 Novhorod-Siverskyi, Ukraine
 Chernihiv, Ukraine
 Oster, Ukraine
 Kyiv,  Ukraine

The Svensky Monastery is located at the confluence of the Desna and the Sven River.

See also
 List of rivers of Russia
 List of rivers of Ukraine

References

External links

 Desna River at the Encyclopedia of Ukraine
 Brockhaus and Efron Encyclopedic Dictionary — Desna, a tributary of the Dnepr 
 Desna floodplains (Заплава Десни). Wetlands and swamps of Ukraine.

 

Desna River
International rivers of Europe
Rivers of Bryansk Oblast
Rivers of Chernihiv
Rivers of Chernihiv Oblast
Rivers of Smolensk Oblast
Tourist attractions in Chernihiv
Tourist attractions in Chernihiv Oblast
Tourism in Chernihiv